Roslin House in Haverford, Pennsylvania, United States, was built in 1911 for Horace B. Forman Jr. and his wife, Elizabeth Chandlee Forman. The Philadelphia Quaker architect William L. Price designed and built the house from sketches provided by the Formans. Dr. H. Chandlee Forman, son of Horace and Elizabeth, donated the house to Haverford College in 1948.

Since then, it has served as Haverford College's La Casa Hispánica, "a Special Interest House which supports the endeavors of students actively engaged in organizing programs concerned with the cultures and civilizations of the Spanish-speaking world." 

Built of cut stone, the three-story Gothic Revival house is designed after Roslin Castle and Chapel in Scotland. Its font (east) facade features a pair of extended gabled pavilions. A two-story turret containing the main staircase, and a hooded entry porch project from the southern extended gable. Extending south perpendicularly from this gable is the home's interior showpiece: a dramatic two-story living space containing a vaulted ceiling, exposed wood beams, floor-to-ceiling stone fireplace, and balcony around the perimeter of the second floor.

References

Houses in Delaware County, Pennsylvania
Haverford College
Houses completed in 1911
Gothic Revival architecture in Pennsylvania